Cheryl Annie Paris (born 1959) is an American television and film actress and former fashion model.

Career
In 1979, Paris worked as an Elite Agency model, and during that time she posed for fashion layouts found in both Vogue and Mademoiselle magazines. While attending college for two years in Tampa and Miami, she studied criminal justice.

Personal life
Paris and her five older brothers were raised in California by their mother, who divorced their father around 1963. She spent part of her early childhood in the town of North Highlands, California.

Her first marriage (1980–86) was to Delta Air Lines pilot Jim Porter. They had a daughter, Katherine, together in 1984. Her second marriage (1994-2004) was to the much older television actor Ken Kercheval. She was Kercheval's fourth wife. The couple had one child together.

Filmography
Television

Film

References

External links
 

1959 births
American television actresses
Living people
People from Burley, Idaho
Actresses from Idaho
21st-century American women